The Imina Formation is a geologic formation in Nunavut. It preserves fossils dating back to the Silurian period.

See also

 List of fossiliferous stratigraphic units in Nunavut

References
 

Silurian Nunavut
Silurian northern paleotropical deposits